The Coșteiu–Chizătău Canal is a canal in Timiș County, western Romania. It diverts water from the river Timiș to the Bega. It is also fed by the small rivers Biniș and Glavița. It was constructed in 1757–1758.

References

Canals in Romania
CCosteiu Chizatau Canal
CCosteiu Chizatau Canal